James R. Ludlow "Lud" Wray (February 7, 1894 – July 24, 1967) was a professional American football player, coach, and co-founder, with college teammate Bert Bell, of the Philadelphia Eagles of the National Football League. He was the first coach of the Boston Braves (now the Washington Commanders) and of the Eagles. 

He also served as head coach at his alma mater, the University of Pennsylvania.

Playing career

Wray attended Chestnut Hill Academy in Philadelphia, where he lettered in baseball and football. He played his college football at the University of Pennsylvania, was the Quakers' center from 1914 to 1916. 

During World War I, Wray served in the United States Marine Corps. He returned for his senior season in 1919. In additional to football, Wray also played catcher on the Penn baseball team.

Professionally, Wray played for the Buffalo Niagaras, Buffalo Prospects, and Buffalo All-Americans from 1918 until 1921. In 1920 and 1921, Buffalo was a member of the National Football League (then called the American Professional Football Association).

Coaching career

Penn
From 1923 to 1929, Wray served as an assistant football coach at Penn. In 1930, he succeeded Lou Young as head coach. He was fired on December 12, 1930, due to friction with players, alumni, and the public.

Boston Braves 
In 1932, Wray was named head coach of the Boston Braves, a National Football League expansion team. The Braves went 4–4–2 in their inaugural season. He left the team after one season and was replaced by Lone Star Dietz.

Philadelphia Eagles
In 1933, Wray's former teammate and fellow assistant at Penn, Bert Bell convinced him to become coach of the expansion Philadelphia Eagles. By 1936, the club was suffering significant financial losses and was offered for sale at a public auction. Bell was the only bidder and became the team's sole owner. On April 28, Wray refused a 66% reduction in salary and left the team.

Later career
In 1938, Wray became an assistant at Manhattan College. He remained with the school until his resignation in November 1940. 

In 1941, Wray served as an assistant to Ank Scanlan at St. Joseph's Preparatory School in Philadelphia. When Scanlan became head coach at Holy Cross, Wray followed him. In 1943, Scanlan's war commitments limited him to only being able to coach on game day and Wray led the team the rest of the week. Wray and Scanlan had a falling out and Wray was replaced by Ox DaGrosa for 1944. 

Wray served as an assistant coach under Jim Leonard for the Pittsburgh Steelers in 1945.

Personal life and death
On December 26, 1933, Wray married Juanita Sauveur. After Juanita's death in 1950, Wray married the former Frances Cressman.

Death
He died on July 25, 1967, in Philadelphia. At the time of his death, Wray resided in Oreland, Pennsylvania. He was survived by his second wife.

Head coaching record

College

References

1894 births
1967 deaths
American football centers
Buffalo All-Americans players
Holy Cross Crusaders football coaches
Manhattan Jaspers football coaches
Penn Quakers football coaches
Penn Quakers football players
Philadelphia Eagles coaches
Philadelphia Eagles owners
Union Club of Phoenixville players
Union Quakers of Philadelphia players
Boston Braves (NFL) head coaches
High school football coaches in Pennsylvania
Chestnut Hill Academy alumni
United States Marine Corps personnel of World War I
Sportspeople from Philadelphia
Coaches of American football from Pennsylvania
Players of American football from Philadelphia
Philadelphia Eagles head coaches